Infinity is the debut album released by the Japanese band Vivid. This was released in two different versions: a limited CD+DVD edition, and a regular CD only edition. It is the band's first studio album and first album after going major with EPIC Records. The regular edition came with an extra track, "EVER". The song "live your life" was also used as a theme song for the multiplayer online role-playing game Dragon Nest.

Track listing

2012 debut albums